Kanabec County is a county in the East Central part of U.S. state of Minnesota. As of the 2020 census, the population was 16,032. Its county seat is Mora.

History
The Minnesota legislature authorized creation of Kanabec County on March 13, 1858, with territory partitioned from Pine County. No county seat was designated at that time, and the county organization was not effected at that time. The county name came from the Ojibwe term ginebig, meaning "snake," after the Snake River — Kanabecosippi (Ginebigo-ziibi in the modern spelling) — which flows through the county.

The area of Kanabec County was attached to Chisago County for administrative and judicial purposes. What county business was handled locally was performed by part-time County Auditor and County Treasurer, in a single room in a stopping place operated by lumber-trader George Staples at Millet Rapids.

In 1871 the county was detached from Chisago, and assigned to Pine County. This assignment lasted through 1881.

The 1870 United States census listed 53 occupants of the Kanabec County area. However, an influx of settlers into its southern areas occurred in the early 1870s, and by 1876 an official county building was needed. A one-room wood building was erected at Millet Rapids, put into use in 1876. In 1881 the county was detached from Pine, and the government structure was finalized, with the county seat being designated at Brunswick. Only one court term was held at Brunswick; in the 1882 general election, a nearly-unanimous vote designated Mora as the county seat. The old courthouse building was sold to a local farmer, who moved it to his property to use as a home. The wood courthouse erected at Mora was used until 1894, when it burned and was replaced by a more fireproof building.

Geography

The Snake River flows south-southeasterly through the central part of the county, fed by Groundhouse River (flowing northeasterly from the county's SW corner) and Red Creek and Mud Creek. The Snake continues easterly into Pine County. The county terrain consists of partly-wooded rolling hills, etched by drainages. It is largely devoted to agriculture. The terrain slopes to the south and east, with its highest point near the NW corner, at 1,309' (399m) ASL.

Lakes

 Ann Lake
 Bachman Dam
 Bass Lake (part)
 Beauty Lake
 Featherbed Lake
 Fish Lake
 Knife Lake
 Lake Eleven
 Lake Five
 Lake Full of Fish
 Lewis Lake
 Long Lake
 Pennington Lake
 Pomroy Lake
 Rice Lake
 Thirteen Lake
 White Lily Lake

Major highways

  Minnesota State Highway 23
  Minnesota State Highway 27
  Minnesota State Highway 47
  Minnesota State Highway 65
  Minnesota State Highway 70
  Minnesota State Highway 107
 List of county roads

Adjacent counties

 Aitkin County - north
 Pine County - east
 Chisago County - southeast
 Isanti County - south
 Mille Lacs County - west

Protected areas

 Ann Lake State Wildlife Management Area
 Bean Dam State Wildlife Management Area
 Hay-Snake State Wildlife Management Area
 Rice Creek State Wildlife Management Area
 Rum River State Forest (part)
 Tosher Creek State Wildlife Management Area
 Whited State Wildlife Management Area

Demographics

2010 census
As of the 2010 census, there were 16,239 people and 6,277 households in the county. The population density was 31.1/sqmi (12.0/km2). There were 7,808 housing units (2014 estimate). The racial makeup of the county was 96.6% White, 0.6% Black or African American, 0.8% Native American or Alaska Native, 0.4% Asian, <0.1% Pacific Islander or Native Hawaiian, and 1.6% from other races or two or more races. 1.7% of the population were Hispanic or Latino of any race. As of the 2000 census, 30.2% were of German, 18.1% Swedish, 13.1% Norwegian, 5.5% American and 5.4% Irish ancestry.

In the census of 2000, there were 5,759 households, out of which 34.10% had children under the age of 18 living with them, 58.80% were married couples living together, 8.40% had a female householder with no husband present, and 28.00% were non-families. 23.80% of all households were made up of individuals, and 10.30% had someone living alone who was 65 years of age or older. The average household size was 2.58 and the average family size was 3.03.

The county population contained 24.0% under the age of 18 and 16.4% who were 65 years of age or older. For every 100 females there were 101.2 males.

The median income for a household in the county was $47,068. The per capita income for the county was $22,291. About 14.2% of the population were below the poverty line.

2020 Census

Communities

Cities

 Braham (mostly in Isanti County)
 Grasston
 Mora (county seat)
 Ogilvie
 Quamba

Unincorporated communities

 Brunswick
 Coin
 Grass Lake
 Kroschel
 Lewis Lake
 Warman
 Woodland

Townships

 Ann Lake Township
 Arthur Township
 Brunswick Township
 Comfort Township
 Ford Township
 Grass Lake Township
 Hay Brook Township
 Hillman Township
 Kanabec Township
 Knife Lake Township
 Kroschel Township
 Peace Township
 Pomroy Township
 South Fork Township
 Whited Township

Politics
Kanabec County voters have moved toward the Republican Party in the past few decades; since 1980 the county has selected the Republican Party candidate in 67% of national elections (as of 2020).

See also
 National Register of Historic Places listings in Kanabec County, Minnesota

References

Further reading
 Ziegler, Frank and Robert H Beck (1981). Ken-ā-big : the story of Kanabec County: an illustrated history of Kanabec County, its early years. Mora, MN: B & W Printers. . .

External links
Mn/DOT map of Kanabec County

 
Minnesota placenames of Native American origin
1882 establishments in Minnesota
Populated places established in 1882